Ruark is a surname. Notable people with the surname include:

Arthur Ruark (1899–1979), American physicist who worked in the development of quantum mechanics
Davis R. Ruark (born 1955), former State's Attorney for Wicomico County, Maryland
Gibbons Ruark (born 1941), contemporary American poet
Jeanne Ruark Hoff (born in Mississippi) is a former college basketball player for Stanford University
Rebecca T. Ruark (skipjack), Chesapeake Bay skipjack built at Taylor's Island, Maryland in 1896
Robert Ruark (1915–1965), American author and syndicated columnist

See also
Ruark number (RU), a dimensionless number see in fluid mechanics